Capital punishment is a legal penalty in Jamaica.  Currently, the only crime punishable by death is aggravated murder. The method of execution is hanging. Jamaica was originally a British colony. The last person executed in Jamaica was Nathan Foster, who was convicted of murder and hanged in 1988. The Jamaican Parliament had placed a moratorium on the death penalty until 2009, when it was lifted. Since 2009, capital punishment is legal and executions in Jamaica could resume; however, there have been no executions since.

In 1999, a series of hangings - by some accounts, amounting to 50 - were scheduled by the Jamaican government, following the recent hangings (the first in 20 years) in Trinidad and Tobago. Ultimately, after international protests, they executions were not carried out. 

It was estimated in 2012 that there were seven or eight inmates in Jamaica currently under a sentence of death. However, by 2018 this had been reduced to zero, with no executions having taken place.

References

External links
https://web.archive.org/web/20091121045649/http://news.sky.com/skynews/Home/World-News/Jamaica-Death-Penalty-To-Stay-After-Parliament-Vote-Despite-Human-Rights-Protests/Article/200811415162159

 

Jamaica
Law enforcement in Jamaica
Murder in Jamaica
Human rights abuses in Jamaica